The Ward River, part of the Murray-Darling basin, is a river located in Central West Queensland, Australia.

The Langlo is itself a tributary of the Warrego River that flows into the Darling River. The river descends  over its  course.

See also

References

Rivers of Queensland
Tributaries of the Darling River
Central West Queensland